Vangelis Moiropoulos (25 March 1905 – 12 October 1996) was a Greek sprinter. He competed in the 4 × 100 metres relay at the 1928 Summer Olympics and the 1932 Summer Olympics.

References

1905 births
1996 deaths
Athletes (track and field) at the 1928 Summer Olympics
Athletes (track and field) at the 1932 Summer Olympics
Greek male sprinters
Greek male hurdlers
Olympic athletes of Greece
Place of birth missing
Sportspeople from the Peloponnese
People from Laconia
20th-century Greek people